This is a list of the paramounts of the Xhosa of the Eastern Cape province in modern South Africa.

 Gcaleka kaPhalo (1775–1792)
 Khawuta kaGcaleka (1792–1804)
 Nqoko kaGcaleka (1804–1820)
 Hintsa kaKhawuta (1820–1835)
 Sarili kaHintsa (1835–1892)
 Sigcawu kaSarili (1892–1902)
 Salukaphathwa Gwebi'nkumbi Sigcawu (1902–1921)
 Daliza Sigcawu (1921–1923)
 Mpisekhaya Ngangomhlaba Sigcawu (1923–1933)
 Bungeni Zwelidumile Sigcawu (1933–1965)
 Xolilizwe Mzikayise Sigcawu (1965–2005)
 Zwelonke Sigcawu (2005–2019)
 Dumehleli Nongudle Mapasa, Regent (2019–2020)
 Ahlangene Sigcawu (2020–Present)

See also

Gcaleka
Rharhabe
Sandile (disambiguation)
Sebe (surname)
Sigcawu
List of rulers of the Rharhabe
List of Xhosa Chiefs
List of Xhosa Kings
List of Xhosa people

 
Gcaleka
South Africa history-related lists
Gcaleka